The Bijbels Museum ("Biblical Museum") is a museum on the Herengracht in Amsterdam housing a collection of Bibles and other religious objects from the Judeo-Christian tradition, including the oldest Bible printed in the Netherlands (the 1477 Delftse Bijbel,), a first edition of the 1637 Dutch Authorised Version, and a facsimile copy of a Dead Sea scroll from Qumran containing the Book of Isaiah.

The museum also houses archaeological discoveries, artifacts from ancient Egypt collected by Leendert Schouten in the 19th century: oil lamps, clay tablets, earthenware, shards of pottery and coins. They give an impression of the religious life of the ancient Egyptians.

There are also some replicas of the ancient Jewish Temple, including models of Solomon's Temple and Herod's Temple, as well as a 19th-century model of the Tabernacle, a reconstruction of the sacred shrine housing the Ark of the Covenant described in the Hebrew Bible, which the Israelites carried with them during their exile in the desert under the leadership of Moses. One part of the exhibit is called the "story attic for children," using light and sound to retell Biblical stories in three different settings: Egypt, Jerusalem, and the desert. This exhibit was designed by Abbie Steinhauser and Saskia van der Zanden, both graduates of the Gerrit Rietveld Academie.

In 2009, the museum, with financial support from a Dutch lottery operator, was able to acquire the so-called Van Noordwijk collection, a collection of religious books with silver coverings.

Founded in 1852, the museum celebrated its 150th anniversary in 2002 in the presence of Queen Beatrix. Thanks in part to popular temporary exhibitions and extensive renovations its number of visitors increased by 40% between 2001 and 2002, and it drew a record number of visitors, more than 47,000, in 2006. The museum continues to receive government subsidies for its operating budget, even though, according to the Dutch governmental council which decides on these matters, it has not done enough to attract a more diverse (i.e., non-denominational) audience.

Building
The museum is housed since 1975 in two imposing canalside buildings, part of a four-building complex known as the Cromhouthuizen, on Amsterdam's Herengracht canal. The buildings harbor a collection of architectural and historical items, including two of the best-preserved antique kitchens in the Netherlands, dating from the 17th century.  They were designed by Philip Vingboons in 1622 for the wealthy wood merchant and art collector Jacob Cromhout for whom they are named. They have original details such as the ceiling paintings by Jacob de Wit, which were restored in 1999–2000.

Gallery

References

External links

 Bijbels Museum

Museums in Amsterdam
Rijksmonuments in Amsterdam
Museums established in 1852
Literary museums in the Netherlands
Egyptological collections
Bible-themed museums, zoos, and botanical gardens
1852 establishments in the Netherlands
19th-century architecture in the Netherlands